Ángel Godinez Luévano (born October 1, 1949) is an American labor leader and activist who was the principal litigant in the class action suit Luévano v. Campbell. He is also a graduate of the Hastings College of the Law.

Luévano, who is of Mexican-American ethnicity, went on to work as a career civil servant with OFCCP, serving as the Deputy Director of the DPO in its national office. After serving 3 terms as State Director for California of LULAC, He now serves as National Vice President for the Far-West Region of LULAC.

References

External links
 

American trade union leaders
Activists for Hispanic and Latino American civil rights
Living people
University of California, Hastings College of the Law alumni
American people of Mexican descent
Roman Catholic activists
1949 births